The Rally for Mali (French: Rassemblement pour le Mali) is a Malian political party created by Ibrahim Boubacar Keïta (a former president of Mali) in June 2001. In 2013, Keita was elected President of Mali following several unsuccessful attempts, and the party took first place in parliamentary elections, winning 66 seats, although not enough for a majority.

In October 2000, Ibrahim Boubacar Keïta, the former prime minister of Mali, resigned from incumbent President Alpha Oumar Konaré's party, the Alliance for Democracy in Mali-African Party for Solidarity and Justice (ADEMA-PASJ), over which he had presided since 1994. With activists and executives in tow, Keïta created the movement Alternative 2002 in February 2001 to back his bid for president. The Rally for Mali followed in June.

In the first round of the presidential election, held in April 2002, Keïta won 21.04% of the vote, finishing third, after the official candidate of the ADEMA-PASJ, Soumaïla Cissé, and the winner, Mali's next president, Amadou Toumani Touré.

Along with the National Congress for Democratic Initiative (Congrès national d’initiative démocratique) (CNID) and the  Patriotic Movement for Revival (Mouvement patriotique pour le renouveau) (MPR), Rally for Mali was part of the Hope 2002 coalition (Espoir 2002) for the 2002 legislative elections. After those elections, Rally for Mali became the second biggest political party in Mali, with 45 deputies.

The Rally won roughly 13% of the vote in municipal elections of May 30, 2004.

In January 2007, Keïta was again designated as the party's candidate for the April 2007 presidential election. In the election, he took second place behind Touré, receiving 19.15% of the vote.

The RPM, part of the opposition Front for Democracy and the Republic (FDR), won 11 out of 147 seats in the July 2007 parliamentary election.

The Rally for Mali finally won presidential and parliamentary elections in 2013, when Mali transitioned back to democracy following a military coup.

The symbol of the party is the weaver.

The Rally for Mali is a full member of the Socialist International.

Electoral history

Presidential elections

National Assembly elections

References 

2001 establishments in Mali
Political parties established in 2001
Political parties in Mali
Full member parties of the Socialist International
Socialism in Mali
Social democratic parties in Africa